Gehrenberg Tower is a 30 metres tall observation tower of lattice steel on Gehrenberg, a 754 m high mountain north of Markdorf, standing at an elevation of 704 m. Gehrenberg Tower has some similarities to Eiffel Tower as it also has a bow between its feet.
From the observation deck of Gehrenberg Tower, one can see at clear weather the Alps and the Höchsten mountain.

Gehrenberg Tower, which carries also antennas, belongs to the town of Markdorf, although it stands on the area of Deggenhausertal.

See also 
 List of towers

Observation towers in Baden-Württemberg
1903 establishments in Germany
Towers completed in 1903

de:Gehrenberg#Gehrenbergturm